Kaye Angeli H. Gonzales (born March 9, 1994) is a Filipino teen actress. She is known for her role as April Muñoz in Luv U. Her co-starred, Miles Ocampo and Marco Gumabao.

Personal life
Gonzales is a Registered Medical Technologist. She finished her Doctor of Medicine degree at the De La Salle Medical and Health Sciences Institute with special awards such as Outstanding Clinical Clerk, Family and Community Medicine and Special Citation for Academic Excellence. On November 26, 2020, she passed the licensure examination for physician.

Filmography

References 

Filipino television actresses
Living people
1994 births
21st-century Filipino actresses
Star Magic